Mantar is a German sludge metal duo from Hamburg. It was formed in 2012 by drummer Erinç Sakarya and guitarist Hanno Klänhard. The two are originally from Bremen, but moved to Hamburg. Mantar means mushroom in Turkish.

History 
Mantar was formed in 2012 by two old friends, drummer Erinç Sakarya and guitarist Hanno Klänhard. The band's music was influenced by the early works of bands such as Melvins, Darkthrone and Motörhead. The duo released their debut studio album, Death by Burning, in 2014 on the Svart Records. In 2016 band signed to the Nuclear Blast. In same year they released second album, called Ode to the Flame. In the summer of 2018, the third album, The Modern Art of Setting Ablaze, was released. In 2020 band released cover album Grungetown Hooligans II. In April 2022, the band announced their next album, Pain Is Forever and This Is the End, released on 15 July.

Members
Erinç Sakarya – drums, vocals (2012–present)
Hanno Klänhardt – vocals, guitars (2012–present)

Discography
Studio albums
Death by Burning (2014)
Ode to the Flame (2016)
The Modern Art of Setting Ablaze (2018)
Grungetown Hooligans II (2020)
Pain Is Forever and This Is the End (2022)

Singles and EPs
Spit (2013)
The Berserker's Path  (2014)
Cross The Cross (2016)
The Spell (2017)
Conquest Of Rats (2018)

Other
St. Pauli Sessions (2016)

References

External links
 
 
 

German doom metal musical groups
Sludge metal musical groups
Heavy metal duos
Musical groups established in 2012
Musical groups from Hamburg
2012 establishments in Germany